The woolly rhinoceros (Coelodonta antiquitatis) is an extinct species of rhinoceros that was native to Northern Eurasia during the Pleistocene epoch. The woolly rhinoceros was a member of the Pleistocene megafauna. The woolly rhinoceros was covered with long, thick hair that allowed it to survive in the extremely cold, harsh mammoth steppe. It had a massive hump reaching from its shoulder and fed mainly on herbaceous plants that grew in the steppe. Mummified carcasses preserved in permafrost and many bone remains of woolly rhinoceroses have been found. Images of woolly rhinoceroses are found among cave paintings in Europe and Asia. The species became extinct at the end of the Last Glacial Period, with its decline probably predominantly driven by unfavourable environmental change caused by a warming climate.

Taxonomy
 
Woolly rhinoceros remains have been known long before the species was described, and were the basis for some mythical creatures. Native peoples of Siberia believed their horns were the claws of giant birds. A rhinoceros skull was found in Klagenfurt, Austria, in 1335, and was believed to be that of a dragon. In 1590, it was used as the basis for the head on a statue of a lindworm. Gotthilf Heinrich von Schubert maintained the belief that the horns were the claws of giant birds, and classified the animal under the name Gryphus antiquitatis, meaning "griffin of anquity".

One of the earliest scientific descriptions of an ancient rhinoceros species was made in 1769, when the naturalist Peter Simon Pallas wrote a report on his expeditions to Siberia where he found a skull and two horns in the permafrost. In 1772, Pallas acquired a head and two legs of a rhinoceros from the locals in Irkutsk, and named the species Rhinoceros lenenesis (after the Lena River). In 1799, Johann Friedrich Blumenbach studied rhinoceros bones from the collection of the University of Göttingen, and proposed the scientific name Rhinoceros antiquitatis. The geologist Heinrich Georg Bronn moved the species to Coelodonta in 1831 because of its differences in dental formation with members of the Rhinoceros genus. This name comes from the Greek words κοιλος (koilos, "hollow") and ὀδούς (odoús "tooth"), from the depression in the rhino's molar structure, giving the scientific name Coelodonta antiquitatis, "hollow-tooth of antiquity".

Evolution
The woolly rhinoceros was the most recent species of the genus Coelodonta. The closest living relative of Coelodonta is the Sumatran rhinoceros, and the genus is also closely related to the extinct genus Stephanorhinus. A cladogram showing the relationships of C. antiquitatis to other Late Pleistocene-recent rhinoceros species based on genomic data given below.

The oldest known species of Coelodonta, Coelodonta thibetana is known from the Pliocene of Tibet dating to approximately 3.7 million years ago, with the genus being present in the Siberia, Mongolia and China during the Early Pleistocene. The woolly rhinoceros first appeared during the early Middle Pleistocene in China, and the oldest remains of the species in Europe, which represents the only species of Coelodonta to have been present in the region, date to approximately 450,000 years ago. The woolly rhinoceros is divided into two chrono-subspecies, with C. a. praecursor from the middle Pleistocene and C. a. antiquitatis from the late Pleistocene.

Description

Structure and appearance

Both males and females had two horns which were made of keratin, with one long horn reaching forward and a smaller horn between the eyes. Compared to other rhinoceroses, the woolly rhinoceros had a longer head and body, and shorter legs. Its shoulder was raised with a powerful hump, used to support the animal's massive front horn. The hump also contained a fat reserve to aid survival through the desolate winters of the mammoth steppe.

Frozen specimens indicate that the rhino's long fur coat was reddish-brown, with a thick undercoat that lay under a layer of long, coarse guard hair thickest on the withers and neck. Shorter hair covered the limbs, keeping snow from attaching. The body's length ended with a  tail with a brush of coarse hair at the end. Females had two nipples on the udders.

The woolly rhinoceros had several features reducing the body's surface area and minimized heat loss. Their tails were also relatively shorter.

Skull and dentition

It was longer than those of other rhinoceros, giving the head a deep, downward-facing slanting position, similar to its fossil relatives Stephanorhinus hemiotoechus and Elasmotherium as well as the white rhinoceros. Strong muscles on its long occipital bone formed its neck hock and held the massive skull. The teeth of the woolly rhinoceros had thickened enamel and an open internal cavity. Like other rhinos, adults did not have incisors. It had 3 premolars and 3 molars in both jaws. The molars were high-crowned and had a thick coat of cementum.

The nasal septum of the woolly rhinoceros was ossified, unlike modern rhinos. This was most common in adult males. This adaptation probably evolved as a result of the heavy pressure on the horn and face when the rhinoceros grazed underneath the thick snow. Unique to this rhino, the nasal bones were fused to the premaxillae, which is not the case in older Coelodonta types or today's rhinoceroses. This ossification inspired the junior synonym specific name tichorhinus, from Greek τειχος (teikhos) "wall", ῥις (ῥιν-) (rhis (rhin-)) "nose".

Paleobiology

The woolly rhinoceros had a similar life history to modern rhinos. Studies on milk teeth show that individuals developed similarly to both the white and black rhinoceros. The two teats in the female suggest that she raised one calf, or more rarely two, every two to three years.

With their massive horns and size, adults had few predators, but young individuals could be attacked by animals such as hyenas and cave lions. A skull was found with trauma indicating an attack from a feline, but the animal survived to adulthood.

Woolly rhinos may have used their horns for combat, probably including intraspecific combat as recorded in cave paintings, as well as for moving snow to uncover vegetation during winter. They may have also been used to attract mates. Bull woolly rhinos were probably territorial like their modern counterparts, defending themselves from competitors, particularly during the rutting season. Fossil skulls indicate damage from the front horns of other rhinos,  and lower jaws and back ribs show signs of being broken and re-formed, which may have also come from fighting. The apparent frequency of intraspecific combat, compared to recent rhinos, was likely a result of rapid climatic change during the last glacial period, when the animal faced increased stress from competition with other large herbivores.

Diet
Woolly rhinoceroses mostly fed on grasses and sedges that grew in the mammoth steppe. Its long, slanted head with a downward-facing posture, and tooth structure all helped it graze on vegetation. It had a wide upper lip like that of the white rhinoceros, which allowed it to easily pluck vegetation directly from the ground. Pollen analysis shows it also ate woody plants (including conifers, willows and alders), along with flowers, forbs and mosses. Isotope studies on horns show that the woolly rhinoceros had a seasonal diet; different areas of horn growth suggest that it mainly grazed in summer, while it browsed for shrubs and branches in the winter.

A strain vector biomechanical investigation of the skull, mandible and teeth of a well-preserved last cold stage individual recovered from Whitemoor Haye, Staffordshire, revealed musculature and dental characteristics that support a grazing feeding preference. In particular, the enlargement of the temporalis and neck muscles is consistent with that required to resist the large tugging forces generated when taking large mouthfuls of fodder from the ground. The presence of a large diastema supports this theory.

Comparisons with living perissodactyls confirm that the woolly rhinoceros was a hindgut fermentor with a single stomach, consuming cellulose-rich, protein-poor fodder. It had to consume a heavy amount of food to account for the low nutritive content of its diet. Woolly rhinos living in the Arctic during the Last Glacial Maximum consumed approximately equal volumes of forbs, such as Artemisia, and graminoids.

Growth
It is estimated that woolly rhinoceroses could reach around 40 years of age, like their modern relatives. In 2014, Shpansky analysed the growth of woolly rhinoceros from its early life stages based on several lower jaw fragments and limb bones.

Habitat and distribution

The woolly rhinoceros lived mainly in lowlands, plateaus and river valleys, with dry to arid climates, and migrated to higher elevations in favourable climate phases. It avoided mountain ranges, due to heavy snow and steep terrain that the animal could not easily cross. The rhino's main habitat was the mammoth steppe, a large, open landscape covered with wide ranges of grass and bushes. The woolly rhinoceros lived alongside other large herbivores, such as the woolly mammoth, giant deer, reindeer, saiga antelope and bison – an assortment of animals known as the Mammuthus-Coelodonta Faunal Complex. With its wide distribution, the woolly rhinoceros lived in some areas alongside the other rhinoceroses Stephanorhinus and Elasmotherium.

By the end of the Riss glaciation about 130,000 years ago, the woolly rhinoceros lived throughout northern Eurasia, spanning most of Europe, the Russian Plain, Siberia, and the Mongolian Plateau, ranging to extremes of 72° to 33°N. Fossils have been found as far north as the New Siberian Islands. It had the widest range of any rhinoceros species.

It seemingly did not cross the Bering land bridge during the last ice age (which connected Asia to North America), with its easterly-most occurrence at the Chukotka Peninsula, probably due to the low grass density and lack of suitable habitat in the Yukon combined with competition from other large herbivores on the frigid land bridge.

Relationship with humans

Hunting
Woolly rhinoceroses shared their habitat with humans, but direct evidence that they interacted is relatively rare. Only 11% of the known sites of prehistoric Siberian tribes have remains or images of the animal. Many rhinoceros remains are found in caves (such as the Kůlna Cave in Central Europe), which were not the natural habitat of either rhinos or humans, and large predators such as hyenas may have carried rhinoceros parts there. Sometimes, only individual teeth or bone fragments are uncovered, which usually came from only one animal. Most rhinoceros remains in Western Europe are found in the same places where human remains or artifacts were found, but this may have occurred naturally.

Signs that early humans hunted or scavenged the rhinoceros come from markings on the animal's bones. One specimen had injuries caused by human weaponry, with traces of a wound from a sharp object marking the shoulder and thigh, and a preserved spear was found near the carcass. A few sites from the early phase of the Last Glacial Period in the late Middle Paleolithic, such as the Gudenus Cave (Austria) and the open air site of Königsaue (Saxony-Anhalt, Germany), have heavily beaten rhinoceros bones lined with slash marks. This action was done partly to extract the nutritious bone marrow.

Both horns and bones of the rhinoceros were used as raw materials for tools and weapons, as were remains from other animals. In what is now Zwoleń, Poland, a device was made from a battered woolly rhinoceros pelvis. Half-meter spear throwers, made from a woolly rhinoceros horn about 27,000 years ago, came from the Yana Rhinoceros Horn Site on the banks of the Yana River. A 13,300 year-old spear found on Bolshoy Lyakhovsky Island has a tip made of rhinoceros horn, the furthest north a human artifact has ever been found.

The Pinhole Cave Man is a late Paleolithic figure of a man engraved on a rib bone of a woolly rhinoceros, found at Creswell Crags in England.

Ancient art

Many cave paintings from the Upper Paleolithic depict woolly rhinoceroses. The animal's defining features are prominently drawn, complete with the raised back and hump, contrasting with its low-lying head. Two curved lines represent the ears. The animal's horns are drawn with their long curvature, and in some cases the coat is also indicated. Many paintings show a black band dividing the body.

About 20 Paleolithic drawings of woolly rhinos were known before the discovery of the Chauvet Cave in France. They are dated at over 31,000 years old, probably from the Aurignacian, engraved on cave walls or drawn in red or black. One scene depicts two rhinos fighting each other with their horns. Other illustrations are found in the Rouffignac and Lascaux caves. One drawing from Font-de-Gaume shows a noticeably higher head posture, and others were drawn in red pigments in the Kapova Cave in the Ural Mountains. Some images show rhinoceroses struck with spears or arrows, signifying human hunting.

The site of Dolní Věstonice in Moravia, Czech Republic, was found with more than seven hundred statuettes of animals, many of woolly rhinoceroses.

Extinction

Many of the remaining Eurasian steppe megafauna of the Pleistocene, like the woolly rhinoceros, became extinct by the retreat of the Last Glacial Maximum. Theories for the cause of the extinction of Coelodonta antiquitatis are climate change associated with the receding Ice age and human hunting (q.v. Quaternary extinction event). Other cold-adapted species, such as reindeer, muskox and wisent, survived this period of climatic change and many others like it. However, more recent studies indicate that the woolly rhinoceros may have been specialized to the mammoth steppe, and the paludification and dramatic shrinkage of this habitat due to increased preciptation following the Last Glacial Maximum may have caused its range to slowly contract to whatever refugia were left for the steppe, and ultimately go extinct.

Radiocarbon dating indicates that populations survived as recently as about 10,000 BC in western Siberia.   However, the accuracy of this date is uncertain, as several radiocarbon plateaus exist around this time. A Holocene survival of the species in supported by eDNA studies showing that the woolly rhinoceros persisted in northeastern Siberia until 9.8 ± 0.2 ka.

Fossil specimens

Frozen specimens
 
Many rhinoceros remains have been found preserved in the permafrost region. In 1771, a head, two legs and hide were found in the Vilyuy River in eastern Siberia and sent to the Kunstkamera in Saint Petersburg. Later in 1877, a Siberian trader recovered a head and one leg from a tributary of the Yana River.

In October 1907, miners in Starunia, Russian Empire, found a mammoth carcass buried in an ozokerite pit. A month later, a rhinoceros was found  underneath. Both were sent to the Dzieduszycki Museum, where a detailed description was published in the museum's monograph. Photographs were published in paleontological journals and textbooks, and the first modern paintings of the species were based on the mounted specimen. The rhino is now located in the Lviv National Museum along with the mammoth. Later, in 1929, the Polish Academy of Arts and Sciences sent an expedition to Starunia, finding the mummified remains of three rhinos. One specimen, missing only its horns and fur, was taken to the Aquarium and Natural History Museum in Kraków. A plaster cast was made soon afterwards, which is now held in the Natural History Museum in London.

Skull and rib fragments of a rhinoceros were found in 1972 in Churapcha, between the Lena and Amga rivers. A whole skeleton was found soon afterwards, with preserved skin, fur, and stomach contents. In 1976, schoolchildren on a class trip found a 20,000 year old rhinoceros skeleton on the Aldan River's left bank, uncovering a skull with both horns, a spine, ribs and limb bones.

In 2007, a partial rhinoceros carcass was found in the lower reaches of the Kolyma river. Its upward-facing position indicates that the animal probably fell into mud and sank. Next year in 2008, a nearly complete skeleton came from the Chukochya River. That same year, locals near the Amga discovered mummified rhinoceros remains, and over the next two years, pelvic bones, tail vertebrae and ribs were excavated along with forelimbs and hind limbs with toes intact.

In September 2014, a mummified young rhinoceros was discovered by two hunters, Alexander “Sasha” Banderov and Simeon Ivanov, at a tributary of the Semyulyakh River in the Abyysky District in Yakutia, Russia. Its head and horns, fur, and soft tissues were recovered. Some parts had been thawed and eaten, since they were not covered by permafrost. The body was handed over to the Yakutia Academy of Sciences, where it was named “Sasha” after one of its discoverers. Dental analysis shows that the calf was about seven months old at the time of its death. With its well-intact preservation, scientists proceeded to undergo DNA analysis.

In August 2020, a rhinoceros was found, after being revealed by melting permafrost, close to site of the 2014 discovery. The rhino was between three and four years old and it is thought that the cause of death was drowning. It is one of the best preserved animals recovered from the region, having most of its internal organs intact. The discovery was also notable for the preservation of a small nasal horn, a rarity as these normally decompose quickly.

See also
Elasmotherium, another Pleistocene Eurasian rhinoceros

References

 Parker, Steve. Dinosaurus: The Complete Guide to Dinosaurs. Firefly Books Inc, 2003. Pg. 422.

External links

 More pictures of the fully preserved tar pit wholly rhinoceros that was found in Poland (text in Polish)
 Fossil skull of a woolly rhinoceros from Belgium
 Fossil skull of a woolly rhinoceros from Germany
 International Rhino Foundation: Woolly Rhino

Pleistocene extinctions
Prehistoric mammals of Europe
Pliocene rhinoceroses
Piacenzian first appearances
Pleistocene rhinoceroses
Fossil taxa described in 1831
Taxa named by Johann Friedrich Blumenbach
Coelodonta